Baghak may refer to:
Baghak, Hormozgan, Iran
Baghak, Kerman, Iran
Baghak, Qom, Iran
Bagh-e Yek or Baghak, Qom, Iran
Baghak, Razavi Khorasan, Iran
Baghak-e Sofla, Razavi Khorasan Province, Iran
Baghak, Khash, Sistan and Baluchestan Province, Iran
Baghak, Tehran, Iran
Baghak Rural District, in Bushehr Province, Iran
Baghak, Afghanistan, a village near the Shakari valley in Bamyan, Afghanistan

See also
Battle of Baghak, a 2012 battle in Afghanistan